The Zagreb Philharmonic Orchestra (Croatian: Zagrebačka filharmonija) is an orchestra based in Zagreb, Croatia. It was officially founded on the 30 November 1919.

History 
The origins of the orchestra can be found in the opera ensemble of Zagreb's national theatre. In the 19th century, musical ensembles in Zagreb were mostly unorganized, until in 1870, Ivan Zajc established an ensemble for the national theatre. He organised and conducted a professional concert on the 25 February 1871, in Stanković's theatre (the present-day building of the Zagreb Assembly). The orchestra performed a Quodlibet, a style of composition where melodies and motifs from a range of pieces would be combined into a single performance.   

A symphony in 1916 marked a historical performance in Zagreb's musical history. The symphony of young Croatian composers (Croatian: Simfonijski koncert mladih hrvatskih skladatelja) showcased a wide range of composers from the country, including Dora Pejačević.  They played at the Croatian National Theatre. 

After WWI, significant changes were brought to how Zagreb's musical ensembles were organised. In 1919, at the encouragement of violinist Dragutin Arany, the Filharmonic Orchestra was officially founded by some musicians of the opera ensemble. The name changed to Zagreb Philharmonic Orchestra on the 3rd of October, 1920.

Discography 
Beethoven, Violin concerto in D major, conducted by Milan Horvat and Ivan Ozim
Beethoven, Symphony No. 2, Symphony No. 5, conducted by Richard Edlinger 
Beethoven,  Symphony No. 4, Symphony No. 7
Beethoven, Symphony No. 8, conducted by Richard Edlinger and Michael Halász
Beethoven, Symphony No. 9 
Janáček, Sinfonietta, conducted by Lovro Matačić
Keleman, Piano concerto, with Melita Lorković on piano
Mozart, Piano Concerto no. 27, with conductor Mladen Bašić
Prokofiev: Symphony No. 1  
Rimsky-Korsakov, Scheherazade, with conductor Pavle Dešpalj
Shostakovich, Symphony No. 1, conducted by Milan Horvat
Shostakovich, Symphony No. 9 
Smetana, My Fatherland 
Stravinsky, Petrushka (ballet concerto)

References 

Croatian orchestras
Culture in Zagreb
Musical groups established in 1871
1871 establishments in Austria-Hungary
Classical music in Croatia